Malehloana is a community council located in the Thaba-Tseka District of Lesotho. Its population in 2006 was 11,161.

Villages
The community of Malehloana includes the villages of

References

External links
 Google map of community villages

Populated places in Thaba-Tseka District
Thaba-Tseka District